The General Confederation of Labour of the Congo (Confédération Générale du Travail du Congo or CGTC) is a national trade union centre in the Democratic Republic of the Congo. It is affiliated with the World Federation of Trade Unions.

References

Trade unions in the Democratic Republic of the Congo
World Federation of Trade Unions
Kinshasa